Wolski (feminine: Wolska, plural: Wolscy) is a Polish locational surname, which refers to a person from one of the numerous places called Wola in Poland. Variants of the name include Volski, Volsky, and Wolsky. The surname may refer to:

Albert Wolsky (born 1930), American costume designer
Bartosz Wolski (born 1980), American sprint canoer
Bill Wolski (1944–2006), American football player
Dariusz Wolski (born 1956), Polish cinematographer
Dominika Wolski (born 1975), Canadian actress
Jacek Saryusz-Wolski (born 1948), Polish politician
Ken Wolski (born 1948), American political activist
Marcin Wolski (born 1947), Polish writer
Maryla Wolska (1873–1930), Polish poet 
Mikołaj Wolski (1553–1630), Polish government official 
Patryk Wolski (born 1993), Polish footballer 
Piotr Wolyniec (formerly Piotr Wolski, 1889-1949) Polish landowner and government official 
Rafał Wolski (born 1992), Polish footballer
Robert Wolski (born 1982), Polish athlete
Victor J. Wolski (born 1962), American judge
Włodzimierz Wolski (1824–1882), Polish writer
Wojtek Wolski (born 1986), Canadian ice hockey player
Xawery Wolski (born 1960), Polish artist

See also
 
Volsky (disambiguation)

References

Polish-language surnames
Surnames of Polish origin